Dictator is a genus of round-necked longhorn beetles of the subfamily Cerambycinae.

Species
 Dictator juheli Delahaye, 2009
 Dictator orientalis Hintz, 1913
 Dictator regius (Fabricius, 1801)

Callichromatini